Zanahoria (alternatively titled Detrás de la verdad) is a 2014 film directed by Enrique Buchichio. Inspired by real events, it is a suspense drama, a Uruguayan-Argentine co-production filmed in Uruguay.

Plot 
The story is based on events that occurred in Uruguay prior to the national elections of 2004. Two journalists are contacted by an informant who offers them evidence of crimes that took place during the Uruguayan dictatorship of 1973–1985 under the so-called Operación Zanahoria ("Operation Carrot").

Production 
The film was produced by Natacha López and Guillermo Casanova, of Lavorágine Films,  and by Hugo Castro Fau and Carolina Álvarez of Lagarto Cine.

Cast 
 César Troncoso (Walter)
 Martín Rodríguez (Jorge)
 Abel Tripaldi (Alfredo)

 Nelson Guzzini (Osvaldo)
 Mónica Navarro (Silvina)
 Victoria Césperes (Vicky)

 Carlos Vallarino (Mario)
 Ana Rosa (Clara)
 Martín Pavlovsky (Eduardo)

Awards 
 2014: Colón de Oro, Festival de Huelva
 2014: Montevideo Audiovisual Member of the Departmental Intendancy of Montevideo: Finalización
 2013: Promotional Fund Prize from the Institute of Cinema and the Audiovisual of Uruguay
 2013: INCAA Prize, Argentina
 2013: Montevideo Audiovisual Member of the Departmental Intendancy of Montevideo: Filma
 2011: FONA Prize (Uruguay)

References

External links 
 

Films set in Uruguay
Uruguayan drama films
Argentine drama films